Asia Taylor (born August 22, 1991) is an American professional basketball player who is currently a free agent. She made her WNBA debut on May 16, 2014.

Louisville statistics

Louisville statistics
Source

WNBA career statistics

Regular season

|-
| align="left" | 2014
| align="left" | Minnesota
| 22 || 0 || 7.9 || .525 || .000 || .750 || 1.4 || 0.5 || 0.2 || 0.0 || 0.7 || 2.7
|-
| align="left" | 2106
| align="left" | Connecticut
| 4 || 0 || 4.3 || .600 || .000 || .857 || 1.0 || 0.8 || 0.0 || 0.0 || 0.3 || 3.0
|-
| align="left" | 2017
| align="left" | Washington
| 24 || 0 || 6.7 || .325 || .000 || .731 || 1.8 || 0.4 || 0.3 || 0.1 || 0.5 || 1.9
|-
| align="left" | 2018
| align="left" | Indiana
| 14 || 0 || 8.3 || .310 || .200 || .778 || 1.8 || 0.4 || 0.2 || 0.0 || 0.8 || 1.9
|-
| align="left" | 2019
| align="left" | Minnesota
| 8 || 0 || 8.1 || .355 || .000 || .833 || 1.8 || 0.9 || 0.1 || 0.1 || 0.6 || 3.1
|-
| align="left" | 2019
| align="left" | Phoenix
| 4 || 0 || 7.8 || .000 || .000 || .500 || 1.8 || 0.3 || 0.3 || 0.9 || 0.5 || 0.3
|-
| align="left" | Career
| align="left" | 5 years, 5 teams
| 76 || 0 || 7.4 || .394 || .111 || .757 || 1.6 || 0.5 || 0.2 || 0.0 || 0.6 || 2.2

Regular season

|-
| align="left" | 2014
| align="left" | Minnesota
| 2 || 0 || 1.0 || 1.000 || .000 || .000 || 0.0 || 0.0 || 0.0 || 0.0 || 0.0 || 1.0
|-
| align="left" | 2017
| align="left" | Washington
| 4 || 0 || 1.8 || 1.000 || .000 || .400 || 0.8 || 0.0 || 0.3 || 0.0 || 0.0 || 1.0
|-
| align="left" | Career
| align="left" | 2 years, 2 teams
| 6 || 0 || 1.5 || 1.000 || .000 || .400 || 0.5 || 0.0 || 0.2 || 0.0 || 0.0 || 1.0

References

External links

Louisville Cardinals bio

1991 births
Living people
American expatriate basketball people in Australia
American expatriate basketball people in Israel
American expatriate basketball people in Italy
American women's basketball players
Basketball players from Columbus, Ohio
Louisville Cardinals women's basketball players
Minnesota Lynx draft picks
Minnesota Lynx players
Small forwards
Sydney Uni Flames players
Washington Mystics players